Óli Johannesen (born 6 May 1972) is a Faroese football player, currently playing for TB Tvøroyri.

Club career
He has played most of his career in the Faroe Islands with TB Tvøroyri, but also spent some seasons in the Danish league. He has spent recent years in the Faroe Islands second division with TB.

International career
Johannesen made his debut for the Faroe Islands in an August 1992 friendly match against Israel.

References

External links

TB Tvøroyri website

1972 births
Living people
Faroese footballers
Faroe Islands international footballers
Hvidovre IF players
Aarhus Gymnastikforening players
Tvøroyrar Bóltfelag players
People from Tvøroyri
Association football defenders